James A. Garfield High School is a public, year-round high school founded in 1925 in East Los Angeles, an unincorporated section of Los Angeles County, California. The proportion of advanced placement by students at Garfield is 38%. Students who are in unfavorable circumstances, with regard to financial or social opportunities, comprise about 93% of the student population. The minority comprehensive admission is 100%. Garfield is one out of 254 high schools in the Los Angeles Unified School District as of 2020. The magnet program in the high school focuses on serving students who plan to study in the Computer Science field. The school was made famous by the film Stand and Deliver about the teacher Jaime Escalante and the HBO film Walkout. The homecoming football game known as the East LA Classic has taken place since 1925.

History
James A. Garfield High School opened in September 1925 on formerly agricultural land, grades 7th through the 12th.  The school was a six-year school in which one could earn two diplomas, one from Garfield Junior High School after completion of 9th grade and one from Garfield Senior High School. 1926 uniforms for girls only were require (navy blue pleated wool skirt; white middy blouse with dark blue collar and cuffs, with or without a black tie. Stockings or socks were worn at all times). By the late 1930s, Garfield became overcrowded and a new Junior High School, grades 7 through 9 was built, Kern Avenue Junior High School located on Fourth Street and Kern Avenue, now called Griffith STEAM Magnet Middle School. LAUSD appointed architect George M. Lindsay to design the original Romanesque Revival campus buildings, one survives today (300 Building) with a modernized front. In the 1950s and 60s, new classroom buildings, and a library with a multistory arcade guided by New Formalism in the 1970s were built.

During World War II, the students of James A Garfield High School worked at Lockheed and Douglas aircraft plants on war aircraft and other war related machining and assembly projects to support the war effort, for school credit and pay. The efforts and details about the program of Garfield High School appeared in a film created for the Army and Navy servicemen and women in 1944 by the Army–Navy Screen Magazine. In addition to military service, dozens of Garfield students and graduates of Japanese descent were relocated to internment camps

At the end of World War II, the necessity for another city college was needed, with a great number of returning servicemen. At the time the first and only city college during the 1940s was Los Angeles City College (LACC). Transportation was limited and costly, lowering the number of students able to attend LACC will at the same time in the Eastside rapidly becoming an industrial center. Arthur Baum, editor of the East Los Angeles Tribune headed a citizen's committee, a group of presidents of all clubs and organizations in the community, Principal D. Raymond Brothers of Garfield, County Supervisor Smith, Superintendent Kersey and various industrial leaders. The group presented the proposition of a Junior College to the Los Angeles City Board of Education in a special meeting on March 1, 1945. The Los Angeles Board of Education voted to establish a Junior College to become East Los Angeles College (ELAC) on the Garfield High School campus. ELAC would be the second city college (or junior college) existing in the Los Angeles area. The Los Angeles City Board of Education established East Los Angeles College in June 1945. The College opened for classes on September 4, 1945. It opened on the campus of Garfield High School with an enrollment of 373 students and a faculty of nineteen, although the school board authorized a faculty of 25, selected from the faculty of LACC. 107 students attended college classes at Garfield, while 266 attended at L.A. County Hospital in health careers, primarily nursing. The junior college was part of the Los Angeles City Public Schools (L.A. Unified School District today).

The college was moved to its present 82-acre site on Avenida Cesar Chavez in February 1948. The college is located six miles from the Los Angeles Civic Center.

It was in the Los Angeles City High School District until 1961, when it merged into LAUSD.
 
Today, the campus retains a few buildings from 1967 and 1968.

Garfield was one of the five schools to initiate student protests known as the East L.A. walkouts in 1968. On March 26, 1968, the LAUSD Board of Education met in the auditorium at Lincoln High School to discuss the students' demands with community members. At the meeting students representing each of the eastside high schools transferred their leadership to the Educational Issues Coordinating Committee (EICC). Garfield also contributed to the walkouts in 2006, in protest to the HR 4437 bill.

In 2018, Garfield High School and the five Walkout schools were included by the National Trust for Historic Preservation on America's 11 Most Endangered Historic Places list in 2008.

Campus 
On May 20, 2007, The auditorium was completely destroyed after an arsonist set fire to the 82-year-old building.

A benefit concert was held collaboratively with Los Lobos, and a donation was given by boxer Oscar De La Hoya. L.A. Unified contends that the 1925 auditorium needs to be rebuilt from the ground up to meet state building codes, but nine insurers insist that the walls are salvageable and could support a new building, district officials said. Garfield's main administration building, which is attached to the auditorium must be retrofitted to meet earthquake standards, and officials have not determined the level of demolition needed.

On March 31, 2010, a day after the death of Jaime Escalante, the Los Angeles Unified School District announced that the new auditorium under construction at Garfield High would be named in his honor. On April 1, a memorial service honoring Escalante was held at Garfield High, where he taught from 1974 to 1991. Students observed a moment of silence on the front steps. About 200 attended, said Principal Jose Huerta. A wake was held on April 17, 2010 for Jaime Escalante in the lecture hall where he taught calculus.

In July 2010, while the school was closed for the first summer vacation since 1991, the Administration Building and the remains of the original Auditorium were demolished. By the start of the school year in September, the entire building was leveled. Only a small power plant remains of the building. The school's 300 building is the final structure that dates back to the school's opening in 1925.
 
On April 5, 2014, Los Angeles Unified School District (LAUSD) officials cut the ribbon on Garfield High's Auditorium project. The new facility includes state-of-the-art upgrades and the new Jaime Escalante Memorial Plaza.

The school is known for its murals. In 2006, due to structural damage, many of the murals were removed.

Demographics 

Full-Time Teachers at Garfield in 2021 were at 104 and they served about 2,569 students in grades nine through twelve. The student-teacher ratio was 25:1. Full-time teachers at Garfield in 2020 were at 108 and they served about 2,531 students in grades nine through twelve. The student-teacher ratio was 23:1. In 2019 Garfield serves around 2,531 with a student-teacher ratio of 25:1 and 101 Full-time teachers.

From the 1930s through the 1950s, Garfield High was predominantly White. However, since the 1960s, the majority of student body has been Hispanic. The school had a total of 4,620 students in the 2005–2006 school year; 99.26% of the students were identified as Hispanic. Students enrolled in the 2009–2010 year was a total of 4,603.

Year-Round Calendar 
Garfield was on a year-round, multi-track schedule to relieve overcrowding from July 1991 to June 2010.  Initially, there were four tracks (A, B, C, and D). The students were, for the most part, randomly assigned to one of three tracks, and alternate two-month vacations. Only three-quarters of the student body were on campus at any given time. In 2010, the School announced that because of the opening of the new Esteban Torres High School, the school would revert to a traditional August–June calendar starting in August 2010.

Academics 
Before the term of Henry Gradillas as principal in the 1980s, the average reading level of 10th grade students (sophomores) was equivalent to that of a student in the second month of the fifth grade, or a 5.2. The total number of AP tests taken at Garfield each year before the Gradillas's term was 56. During Gradillas's term, the average reading level of a 12th grade student (seniors) was the tenth grade level, and the number of AP tests yearly increased to 357. The increase in the reading level was due to required reading and remedial English courses for students at least three grade levels behind and a reading laboratory.

US News Rankings

Small Learning Communities (SLCs)

There are small learning communities (SLCs) in which the student body is divided into smaller academies: Career and Performing Arts Academy, Computer Science Magnet, Global Academy, Humanitas Academy of Leadership and Law, and University Preparatory Program. These are all separated within buildings throughout the campus, each student is divided into each. SLCs were introduced to LAUSD around 2005 to combat dropping out of school.

Advanced Placement

Garfield achieved fame because of Jaime Escalante who, in the 1980s, along with the administration of Henry Gradillas built an exceptional advanced placement  program. In 1982, 18 of his students passed the advanced placement calculus test. The College Board suspected cheating and required the students to re-take the examination. Further testing showed that the students had actually learned the material.

In 1987, 73 students passed, while another 12 passed the second year calculus test. In 1988, a popular film titled Stand and Deliver starring Academy Award-nominee Edward James Olmos was made about the events of 1982. In 1990, there were over 400 students in Escalante's math program from algebra to calculus. In 1991, he had a falling out with the school administration and as a result left the Garfield school system. By 1996, only seven passed the basic calculus exam, with four passing the advanced exam. That was a total of eleven passing students, down from a high of 87 nine years earlier. In 2001, the school made a slight recovery in its calculus scores, with 17 passing the basic test and seven passing the second year test.

In 2004, Newsweek ranked Garfield 581st top high school in the nation. The rank was based on the number of Advanced Placement or International Baccalaureate tests taken by all students at a school in 2004 divided by the number of graduating seniors.

Student performance
In 2005, according to the University of California, Berkeley (UC Berkeley) assistant vice chancellor for admissions and enrollment, Richard Black, Garfield had the highest number of combined Latino/Chicano and African-American students accepted by UC Berkeley.

Sports

American football

Garfield High School participates in the "East L.A. Classic" the homecoming American football game against Theodore Roosevelt High School, that traditionally draws over 20,000 fans. The East LA classic has been held at the East Los Angeles College at the Weingart Stadium although it has also been held at the Los Angeles Memorial Coliseum.

Other sports
Besides the football team playing a big role, there are also other sports who are significant in the annual classic such as: Drill Team, Cheer, and Band. They are well-known and have won competitions throughout the year.

There is also Soccer, Baseball, Softball, Swim, Cross-Country, and Basketball.

Notable alumni
Listed in alphabetical order by last name: 
 Richard Alatorre (born 1943), member of the California State Assembly and the Los Angeles City Council.
Carlos Almaraz (1941–1989), Chicano painter, Garfield High School class of 1959.
John Arguelles (born 1927), former Associate Justice of the California Supreme Court.
J. Jon Bruno (1946–2021), Episcopal Bishop of Los Angeles.
Oscar De La Hoya (born 1973), former world champion and gold medal-winning boxer and founder of Golden Boy Promotions.
Ken Davitian (born 1953), film and television actor, co-star of 2006’s Borat.
Alexander Gonzalez (born 1946), President at California State University, Sacramento.
Antonia Hernandez (born 1948), philanthropist, attorney, activist.
Ricardo Lara (born 1974), California Insurance Commissioner and first LGBT statewide elected leader in California history.
Los Lobos band, multiple Grammy Award-winning Chicano rock band, the alumni members include: 
David Hidalgo (born 1954),
Conrad Lozano (born 1951),
Louie Pérez (born 1953), 
Cesar Rosas (born 1954).
 Richard Polanco (born 1951), former California State Senate Majority leader and member of the California State Assembly.
 George Ramos (1947–2011) Pulitzer Prize–winning journalist for the Los Angeles Times.
Esteban Edward Torres (born 1930), former Congress member from California and former United States Ambassador to the UNESCO.
 Maria Helena Viramontes (born 1954), writer and professor of English at Cornell University.
 Sergio Valdez and Thomas Valdez (1991 Alumni) both employed at NASA's Jet Propulsion Laboratory, where Sergio is a supervisor in the mechanical engineering section and Thomas is a research engineer. Thomas has a master's in materials engineering

See also

High School - World War II war jobs for students - YouTube pictures of Garfield High School students constructing the Lockheed P-38 Lightning.Army–Navy Screen Magazine - Series which was shown to the American soldiers around the world during World War II.Walkout (film) - A 2006 HBO film based on a true story of the 1968 East L.A. walkouts.Stand and Deliver - The film was added to the National Film Registry of the Library of Congress in 2011.The Classic - Film about the Garfields homecoming football game won the 2017 storytelling award from the LA Film Festival.

References
 Jesness, Jerry (coauthor). "Preface." Gradillas, Henry and Jerry Jesness. Standing and Delivering: What the Movie Didn't Tell'' (New Frontiers in Education). R&L Education, November 16, 2010. , 9781607099437.

Notes

External links
Garfield High School homepage
Los Angeles Unified School District Web site
Garfield High School Alumni Foundation website
Home of the Bulldogs

High schools in Los Angeles County, California
Eastside Los Angeles
Los Angeles Unified School District schools
Public high schools in California
1925 establishments in California
Educational institutions established in 1925